Kenya competed at the 1964 Summer Olympics in Tokyo, Japan for the first time as an independent country. 37 competitors, all men, took part in 21 events in 5 sports. Wilson Kiprugut won the nation's first ever Olympic medal.

Medalists

Athletics

Boxing

Hockey

Kenya national field hockey team finished 6th

Sailing

Peter Cooke Rank 24

Shooting

Four shooters represented Kenya in 1964.

25 m pistol
 Leonard Bull
 Alan Handford-Rice

50 m pistol
 Michael Horner

50 m rifle, prone
 Nigel Vernon-Roberts

References

External links
Official Olympic Reports
International Olympic Committee results database

Nations at the 1964 Summer Olympics
1964
1964 in Kenyan sport